Gibsland-Coleman Complex, also known as Gibsland-Coleman High School, is a K-12 school in Gibsland, Louisiana, United States. It is a part of the Bienville Parish School Board.

History

The original Gibsland campus became Coleman High School and, after desegregation in 1969 with the all-white Gibsland High School, was renamed the Gibsland-Coleman Complex.

John Sherman Campbell (1897-1976), was Gibsland High School principal from 1935 to 1938, when he accepted a position in Baton Rouge with the Louisiana Department of Wildlife and Fisheries. A native of Ouachita Parish who was subsequently reared in Oak Grove in West Carroll Parish, Campbell wrote a master's thesis at Louisiana State University in Baton Rouge entitled, The Birds of Bienville Parish. Later, Governor Jimmie Davis appointed him to the Louisiana Commission on Aging, in which capacity he attended the White House Conference on Aging in Washington, D. C., from January 9 to 12, 1961. Campbell, who held the bachelor's degree from Louisiana Tech University in Ruston, had been the principal at Bienville High School in Bienville from 1930 to 1935, when he came to Gibsland High School. An active Baptist layman, Campbell is honored by the establishment of the John S. Campbell Layman Lecture Series at Mid-America Baptist Theological Seminary in Memphis, Tennessee.

Athletics
Gibsland-Coleman High athletics competes in the LHSAA.

References

Notes
 Some text originated from Gibsland, Louisiana

External links
 

Schools in Bienville Parish, Louisiana
Public elementary schools in Louisiana
Public middle schools in Louisiana
Public high schools in Louisiana